Tranmere Rovers Football Club is an English professional association football club founded in 1884, and based in Birkenhead, Wirral. Originally known as Belmont Football Club, they adopted their current name in 1885. They were a founder member of Division Three North in 1921, and were a member of The Football League until 2015, when they were relegated to the National League, the fifth tier of English football. They returned to the Football League in 2018 after defeating Boreham Wood 2-1 in the National League play-off final.

Key

Key to league record
 Year shown in bold when linked to club season article
 Level = Level of the league in the current league system
 Pld = Games played
 W = Games won
 D = Games drawn
 L = Games lost
 GF = Goals for
 GA = Goals against
 GD = Goals difference
 Pts = Points
 Position = Position in the final league table
 Top scorer and number of goals scored shown in bold when he was also top scorer for the division. Number of goals includes goals scored in play-offs.

Key to cup records
 Res = Final reached round
 Rec = Final club record in the form of wins-draws-losses
 PR = Preliminary round
 QR1 (2, etc.) = Qualifying Cup rounds
 G = Group stage
 R1 (2, etc.) = Proper Cup rounds
 QF = Quarter-finalists
 SF = Semi-finalists
 F = Finalists
 A (QF, SF, F) = Area quarter-, semi-, finalists
 W = Winners

Seasons

References

External links

Seasons
 
English football club seasons